This is a list of North Korean actors.

List of actors

Creative Staff

See also 

 List of South Korean actresses
 List of South Korean male actors
 Cinema of North Korea

References

 
North Korean actors
North Korean